The 2020 Super League XXV season is the 25th season of Super League, and 126th season of rugby league in Great Britain. It began on 30 January 2020, and was originally scheduled to end on 10 October 2020. It was to have consisted of 29 regular season games, and four rounds of play-offs, including the Grand Final at Old Trafford. Due to the ongoing effects of the Covid-19 pandemic, there is uncertainty surrounding the remaining fixtures, and the league table will be decided on a percentage basis for the first time since 1930 (excluding the War Emergency Leagues). The fixture list was released on 5 November 2019.

On 20 July 2020 Toronto Wolfpack withdrew from the competition and Super League expunged the teams completed results from the season's results.

On 3 November 2020, Hull KR announced that they were unable to fulfil the remainder of their fixtures, due to a COVID-19 outbreak within the club, and had no alternative but to terminate the remainder of their season. It was also reported, that three players had returned positive tests, with another two inconclusive, five having to self isolate and nine players injured.

Fixtures and results

Round 1

Round 2

Round 3

Round 4

Round 5

Round 6

Round 7

Round 8

Round 9

Round 10

All fixtures are subject to change

Round 11

Round 12

Round 13

Round 14

Round 15

Round 16

Round 17 (Black History Round)

Round 18

Round 19

Round 20

Notes

References

Super League XXV